The 1986 Grote Prijs Jef Scherens was the 22nd edition of the Grote Prijs Jef Scherens cycle race and was held on 22 January 2010. The race started and finished in Leuven. The race was won by Jozef Lieckens.

General classification

References

1986
1986 in road cycling
1986 in Belgian sport